Burness is a surname. Notable people with the surname include:

Courtney Taylor Burness, (born 1995) American teen actress
Don Burness, (1919–1987) All-American basketball player at Stanford University
Gordon Burness (1906–1989), Scottish-born U.S./Canadian soccer player
Pete Burness, (1904-1969) Academy Award-winning American animator and animation director

See also
Burness, California, unincorporated community in California, United States
Burness, Orkney, a United Kingdom location
Burness Paull & Williamsons, a Scottish firm of solicitors